Jagannadhapuram is a village in Eluru district of the Indian state of Andhra Pradesh. It is located in Tadepalligudem mandal of Eluru revenue division.

Demographics 
 Census of India, Jagannadhapuram had a population of 7862. The total population constitute, 3898 males and 3964 females with a sex ratio of 1017 females per 1000 males. 804 children are in the age group of 0–6 years, with sex ratio of 975. The average literacy rate stands at 68.18%.

References 

Villages in Eluru district